Robert "Robbie" Coleman (born 3 August 1990) is an Australian rugby union player who plays for the NOLA Gold in Major League Rugby (MLR).

Coleman left the Brumbies after being granted a release at the end of the 2016 Super Rugby season. His playing position is either fly-half, centre or full-back. He made his Brumbies debut during the 2010 Super 14 season against the Reds in Canberra.

Super Rugby statistics

References

External links
 Brumbies profile

1990 births
Living people
Australian rugby union players
Rugby union centres
ACT Brumbies players
Canberra Vikings players
People from Queanbeyan
Rugby union players from New South Wales
Rugby union wings
Rugby union fullbacks
Australia international rugby sevens players
Commonwealth Games silver medallists for Australia
Commonwealth Games medallists in rugby sevens
Rugby sevens players at the 2010 Commonwealth Games
Commonwealth Games rugby sevens players of Australia
Rugby union fly-halves
Western Force players
RC Narbonne players
New Orleans Gold players
Australian expatriate rugby union players
Expatriate rugby union players in the United States
Australian expatriate sportspeople in the United States
Medallists at the 2010 Commonwealth Games